The ships that participated in the Battle of Lowestoft, a naval engagement between the English and Dutch off the English port of Lowestoft on 13 June (New Style) 1665 during the Second Anglo-Dutch War. 95 English ships (later rising to 100 when ships joined during the battle), commanded by James Stuart, Duke of York, faced 107 Dutch ships led by Jacob van Wassenaer, Baron Obdam. The battle ended in a victory for the English, capturing 9 Dutch ships and sinking 8 others, for the loss of only one ship (the Charity).

British fleet
Although the fleet list dated 10 May (20 May N.S.) names 109 vessels of the 6th Rate and above, 19 had been detached for other duties before the battle, while 5 previously unlisted vessels had arrived. Thus there were 95 ships at the commencement of the battle. 5 of the detached vessels rejoined the fleet during the battle, bringing the total to exactly 100 ships. This total included 24 hired merchantmen (indicated as such in the 'Notes' column).

The White Squadron
The White (or Van) Squadron was under Prince Rupert - his flagship being the Royal James.

The Red Squadron
The Red (or Centre) Squadron was under the Duke of York - his flagship being the Royal Charles.

The Blue Squadron
The Blue (or Rear) Squadron was under Earl of Sandwich - his flagship being the Royal Prince.

Of the ships which had been on the 10 May fleet list but had been detached (excluding the five which rejoined during the battle), the merchantman Good Hope had been captured by the Dutch on 20 May, the Merlin was in the Thames, the Coventry and Lizard were at Portsmouth, the Little Mary at Plymouth, the Paradox at Scilly, the merchantman Maryland was in Harwich ("defective"), the Success in Lowestoft, the Speedwell at Newcastle, the Little Gift in Ireland and the Truelove in the Downs. Three more were engaged in scouting - the Paul, Hector and Blackamoor (a pink). None of these was larger than 5th Rate.

Dutch fleet
The Dutch fleet comprised 107 ships carrying 4,864 guns and 21,613 men. Of these 107 ships, 81 were ships of the line from the five Dutch Admiralties, while 11 were hired merchantmen from the Dutch East India Company (Vereenigde Oostinische Compagnie), indicated by "VOC" in the lists below. There were also 9 frigates and 6 three-mast yachts. The Admiralty to which a ship belonged as indicated by a letter in parenthesis preceding the name:
 (A) Amsterdam Admiralty
 (F) Friesland Admiralty
 (M) Maas (or Rotterdam) Admiralty
 (N) Noorderkwartier Admiralty
 (Z) Zeeland Admiralty

No attempt can be made to indicate order of battle as the Dutch had not adopted the line-ahead system at this date, but the ships are indicated by squadron, within each of which the order of precedence is given, with the ships of the admiral, vice-admiral and rear-admiral listed first.

Squadron Command ships

The 1st (Amsterdam) Squadron

The 2nd (Zeeland) Squadron

The 3rd (Maas) Squadron

The 4th (Friesland) Squadron

The 5th (Amsterdam) Squadron

The 7th (Noorderkwartier) Squadron

Other Dutch ships
Four ships were left behind in the Texel when the fleet sailed on 23/24 May, due to shortage of men. These were the Amsterdam Admiralty's Zuiphen (36), Groot Harder (38), Leiden (36) and Kat (21).

References

External links
 Kentish Knock's blog on Anglo-Dutch Sea Wars

Naval battles of the Second Anglo-Dutch War
Anglo-Dutch Wars orders of battle